Jennie M. Bingham (March 16, 1859 – 1933) was an American author and litterateur.

Early life and education
Jane (nickname, "Jennie") Maria Bingham was born in Fulton, New York, March 16, 1859. She was the daughter of Jane (Mills) (1821-1894) and the Rev. Dr. Isaac Sabin Bingham (1819-1893). For decades, her father was in the ministry of the Methodist Episcopal Church. Jennie's siblings were Charles, Melville, Wilbur, George, Franklin, and Mary.

As an adult, she attended Syracuse University (1896-97) as a non-graduating student.

Career
When poor health ended the possibility of teaching, Bingham started writing for a living. Her first article offered for publication was a short story entitled "A Hospital Sketch", which appeared in the Christian Union. Among her early productions was a missionary story, "A Grain of Mustard Seed" (1881) of which 8,000 copies were sold during the first six months after publication, the proceeds of which founded a home in Japan. She worked in every department of literature, book-reviewing, essay writing, fiction, poetry, Sunday-school literature and art criticism. Some of her short stories appeared in Harper's Young People. Her poetry appeared in The Magazine of Poetry and Literary Review (1895). "Three Reasons", published by the Woman's Foreign Missionary Society of the Methodist Episcopal Church, was prepared especially for the Young Woman's Missionary Societies.

She was the author of Annals of the Round Table (18S5), and All Glorious Within (1889), the latter a story embodying the origin and work of the International Order of the King's Daughters. The life of the seventh Earl of Shaftesbury, K. G. (1899) was part of the Epworth League Reading course of 1899-1900. 

Bingham was specially interested in the charities of New York City, and part of her work included visiting then and writing concerning them. The Newsboys' Lodging House, Five Points Mission, Flower Mission, Florence Night Mission, and Children's Aid Society were among her subjects. Her life was a busy one, in which literature was incidental. Bingham's home was in Herkimer, New York. Representing the New York Branch, Bingham served on the General Executive committee, Woman's Foreign Missionary Society of the Methodist Episcopal Church. She was also employed as an instructor at the Folts Mission Institute, Herkimer, New York.

Death
Jennie M. Bingham died in 1933.

Selected works
 Annals of the Round Table (18S5) (text)
 All Glorious Within (1889)
 The Picket line of missions (co-author; 1897) (text)
 The life of the seventh Earl of Shaftesbury, K. G. (1899) (text)

Short stories
 "A Hospital Sketch"
 "A Grain of Mustard Seed" (1881)
 "Melissa's Successful Failure" (1901)
 "Margy's 'Holy Grail'" (1924)

Non-fiction
 "Charlotte Brontë" (Home College Series; 1883) (text)
 "Margaret Fuller" (Home College Series; 1883) (text)
 "Charles Lamb" (Home College Series; 1883) (text)
 "Question Drawer" (1899)
 "By Way of Illustration" (1899)
 "A Select Three, A Story for Standard Bearers" (1901)
 "Three Reasons" (1901)
 "Some Foreign Standard Bearers" (1901)
 "Briton Rivière" (1902)
 "French's Masterpiece" (1902)
 "Rembrandt and His Picture, 'The Anatomy Lesson'" (1902)

Poems
 "Weights and Wings" 
 "November" 
 "Easter Lilies" 
 "Patience"

References

External links
 
 

1859 births
1933 deaths
Wikipedia articles incorporating text from A Woman of the Century
19th-century American writers
19th-century American biographers
19th-century American women writers
American women biographers
Writers from New York (state)